Duke Ejiofor (born April 24, 1995) is an American football outside linebacker for the Houston Roughnecks of the XFL. He played college football at Wake Forest, and was drafted by the Houston Texans in the sixth round of the 2018 NFL Draft.

College career
As a junior at Wake Forest, Ejiofor had 50 tackles, 17 for losses, 10.5 sacks, one interception and two forced fumbles. He recorded 47 tackles including 15 for losses, eight sacks and six pass breakups as a senior.

Professional career

Houston Texans
Ejiofor was drafted by the Houston Texans in the sixth round, 177th overall, of the 2018 NFL Draft. In Week 2, against the Tennessee Titans, he recorded his first career sack in his NFL debut.

On May 10, 2019, Ejiofor was placed on injured reserve after suffering a season-ending torn Achilles.

On August 21, 2020, Ejiofor was placed on injured reserve for a second consecutive season after suffering a torn ACL. On June 9, 2021, Ejiofor was waived with a failed physical designation.

Atlanta Falcons
On January 13, 2022, Ejiofor signed a reserve/future contract with the Atlanta Falcons. He was released on March 9, 2022.

Houston Roughnecks 
On November 17, 2022, Ejiofor was drafted by the Houston Roughnecks of the XFL. He was placed on the reserve list by the team on February 20, 2023.

Personal life
Ejiofor is descended from Nigerian royalty.

References

External links
 Wake Forest Deamon Deacons bio
 Houston Texans bio

1995 births
Living people
American sportspeople of Nigerian descent
Players of American football from Houston
American football defensive ends
American football linebackers
Wake Forest Demon Deacons football players
Houston Texans players
Atlanta Falcons players
Houston Roughnecks players